Vada Shoal Lighthouse is an active lighthouse, located circa  offshore Vada on the Ligurian Sea, in order to signalling the presence of the shoals.

Description
The tower, settled on a wide concrete jetty encircled by riprap, has the lantern on the top, the lantern dome is painted grey metallic.

The lighthouse is completely automated, powered by a solar unit, and managed by the Marina Militare with the identification code number 1975 E.F.

See also
 List of lighthouses in Italy

References

External links

 Servizio Fari Marina Militare

Lighthouses in Italy
Buildings and structures in Tuscany
Lighthouses in Tuscany